Lisette Titre-Montgomery (born June 21, 1977) is an American video game artist and designer. She has worked at Backbone Entertainment, EA Games, Ubisoft and currently works for Double Fine Productions. Titre is also involved in promoting diversity in video games and computer programming.

Biography 
Titre was born on June 21, 1977. She had been both a gamer and an artist from a young age. After seeing Toy Story, she was inspired to study computer animation. Titre graduated with a degree in computer animation from Miami International University of Art and Design in 2000. Titre currently lives in Oakland and is married to Marcus Montgomery.

Career 
Titre's first animation job was working in 2001 as a character modeler for the game, Freekstyle. Working on Freekstyle helped her land a job as a senior character and special effects artist at EA Games around 2005. She worked on Tiger Woods PGA Tour 2007 as her first project at EA. Other games she helped develop were The Simpsons Game, The Godfather II and Dante's Inferno. In 2011, she left EA Games and went on to become the lead artist at Backbone Entertainment. At Backbone, she worked on Zombie Apocalypse: Never Die Alone and Midway Arcade Origins. Titre returned to EA Games in 2013, where she worked on Dance Central 3 and The Sims 4.

Around 2015, Titre started working as the manager of the art and computer animation department for Ubisoft. Titre was invited to the 2016 White House LGBTQ Tech and Innovation briefing. Starting in 2017, Titre became the art manager at Double Fine Productions, where she has worked on Psychonauts 2.

Titre is a member of Blacks In Gaming, a nonprofit group that provides networking and collaboration opportunities for African Americans working in the gaming industry. She is also involved in Black Girls Code and Girls Who Code. She was featured in Essence in 2018 in an article called "15 Black Women Who Are Paving the Way in STEM and Breaking Barriers."

References

External links 
Official site
Women in Gaming Stories: Lisette Titre-Montgomery

1977 births
American video game designers
American women artists
Double Fine people
Electronic Arts employees
People from Oakland, California
Ubisoft people
Living people
21st-century American women